The 1924–25 Connecticut Aggies men's basketball team represented Connecticut Agricultural College, now the University of Connecticut, in the 1924–25 collegiate men's basketball season. The Aggies completed the season with a 10–4 overall record. The Aggies were members of the New England Conference, where they ended the season with a 3–0 record. The Aggies played their home games at Hawley Armory in Storrs, Connecticut, and were led by second-year head coach Sumner A. Dole.

Schedule 

|-
!colspan=12 style=""| Regular Season

Schedule Source:

References 

UConn Huskies men's basketball seasons
Connecticut
1924 in sports in Connecticut
1925 in sports in Connecticut